Criscianthus is a genus of flowering plants belonging to the family Asteraceae.

Its native range is Southern Tropical Africa.

Species:
 Criscianthus zambiensis (R.M.King & H.Rob.) Grossi & J.N.Nakaj.

References

Asteraceae
Asteraceae genera